Taohua Island is one of the islands of the Zhoushan Archipelago. The island is under the administration of Putuo District, Zhoushan, Zhejiang, China.

The island is mentioned many times in Louis Cha's Condor Trilogy, therefore gaining its popularity.

Tourist attraction 
 The statue of Louis Cha, built in 2001
 Shengyan Monastery (at highest peak of the island; Anqi Mountain. Reachable by car from south side or by foot via a pretty tough path starting in the AAAA tourist attraction park)
 Jilin Pagoda (7 floors, 38 meters high; part of the AAAA tourist attraction park)

External links 
 Official website for Taohua District 
 Taohua Island Tourist Information 
 Story about the bronze statue of Jin Yong 

Zhoushan